Spectroscopy is a trade magazine published since 1985. Spectroscopy has an editorial goal to promote and support the use of spectroscopic instrumentation in applied research, environmental testing, quality control, and the life sciences.

Spectroscopy covers many techniques from analytical chemistry to include: atomic absorption and emission (including plasma-based methods such as ICP and ICP-MS); ultraviolet spectroscopy, visible spectroscopy; infrared spectroscopy (including FT-IR and Near-infrared spectroscopy; fluorescence, phosphorescence, and luminescence; Raman spectroscopy and FT-Raman; X-ray (XRF, XRD, and microanalysis); mass spectrometry; magnetic resonance (NMR, EPR, MRI); surface analysis (ESCA, SIMS, Auger); and laser-based spectroscopic techniques.

References

Monthly magazines published in the United States
English-language magazines
Magazines established in 1985
Magazines published in New Jersey
Professional and trade magazines
Informa brands
1985 establishments in the United States